Galatasaray Spor Kulübü is a Turkish professional football club based in Istanbul, Turkey, who currently play in Süper Lig. This chronological list comprises all those who have held the position of head coach or technical director of the first team of Galatasaray SK since their foundation in 1905. Caretaker managers (interim) are included, as well as those who have been in permanent charge.

The first full-time manager for Galatasaray SK was Boris Nikolof, one of the founders of Galatasaray SK.

The most successful Galatasaray SK manager in terms of trophies won is Fatih Terim, who won eight Süper Lig titles, three Türkiye Kupası trophies, five Süper Kupa, three TSYD Cup and one UEFA Europa League Cup (20 trophies in total) in his 10-year reign as manager.

Statistics

Information correct as of match played 23 June 2022. Only competitive matches are counted.
(n/a) = Information not available

By number of games
Information correct as of match played 20 May 2022. Only competitive matches are counted.
(n/a) = Information not available

Most successful managers 

Most seasons as coach: Fatih Terim, 14 years in four spells from 1996 to 2000, 2002 to 2004, 2011 to 2013 and from 2017 to 2022.
Most consecutive seasons as coach: Fatih Terim managed the club for five years (2017 - 2022).

Notes

References

External links
Managers at Galatasaray.org

 
Galatasaray